Terttu Nevalainen (born 31 May 1952, Vuolijoki) is a Finnish linguist and the current Chair of English Philology at the University of Helsinki. She has been a Member of the Finnish Academy of Sciences since 2001 and was inducted as a First Class Knight of the Order of the White Rose of Finland in 2015. Nevalainen works on corpus linguistics, the History of English, and historical sociolinguistics.

Background and career 
Nevalainen received a B.A. in English Philology and General Linguistics at the University of Helsinki in 1977, before going to University College London for postgraduate studies from 1980 - 1981. She then completed her Ph.L (1986) and Ph.D (1991) at the University of Helsinki. Nevalainen has since served as a visiting scholar at the University of Cambridge and University of Sheffield.

Nevalainen is currently Editor-in-Chief of the monograph series Oxford Studies in the History of English and co-editor of the Advances in Historical Sociolinguistics journal. She is also currently building an open-access Language Change Database to facilitate statistical modelling and comparative sociolinguistic typologies. Since 1993, Nevalainen has been leading the compilation of the Corpora of Early English Correspondence, which currently comprises 5.1 million words of Late Middle and Early Modern English from 1400 - 1800.

In 2002, a Festschrift entitled Variation Past and Present (Mémoires de la Société Néophilologique LXI), was complied in her honor by Raumolin-Brunberg, H. et al.

Notable publications 
 Nevalainen, T. & Raumolin-Brunberg, H. (2017) Historical sociolinguistics: Language change in Tudor and Stuart England. Jan 2017 (2nd rev. ed.) London: Routledge - Taylor & Francis Group.
 Nevalainen, T. (ed.) & Traugott, E. (ed.) (2012) The Oxford Handbook of the History of English. Oxford & New York: Oxford University Press. (Oxford Handbooks in Linguistics)
 Nevalainen, T. (2006) An Introduction to Early Modern English. Edinburgh: Edinburgh University Press.

References

External links 
 University of Helsinki Faculty Page
 Language Change Database 
 Corpora of Early English Correspondence (CEEC)

1952 births
Living people
Linguists from Finland
Academic staff of the University of Helsinki
University of Helsinki alumni
Women linguists